Faye Alicia Brookes (born 3 September 1987) is an English actress. She is known for portraying the role of Kate Connor on the ITV soap opera Coronation Street. In 2021, she competed in the thirteenth series of Dancing on Ice, where she finished in second place.

Early life
Brookes was born on 3 September 1987 in Stretford, Trafford. Whilst growing up, Brookes attended Flixton Junior School and Knutsford High School. She then expressed an interest in musical theatre, initially studying performing arts at  Pendleton College from 2004 onwards, before later attending Guildford School of Acting. She graduated in 2010, after completing a Bachelor of Arts degree in Musical Theatre and being awarded the Principal’s Choice Award.

Career
Prior to appearing on television, Brookes starred in various theatre productions, including Grease, Shrek, Legally Blonde and The Sound of Music. In mid-2015, it was announced that the Connor family in Coronation Street was being extended. The family first appeared in the street in 2006 and have featured in many storylines. Brookes was cast as Kate Connor and after her on-screen brother Aidan Connor made his first appearance, played by The X Factor winner Shayne Ward, Brookes first appeared as Kate in October 2015. She won Best Newcomer for her portrayal of Kate in January 2017 at the 22nd National Television Awards. In April 2019, it was announced that Brookes had decided to leave Coronation Street. Her final scenes were to air later in 2019.

On 24 September 2020, Brookes was announced as a contestant for the 2021 series of Dancing on Ice. Brookes was originally partnered with Hamish Gaman; however, after he withdrew due to an injury in week 6, Brookes was re-partnered with Matt Evers. She finished the competition in second place.

In November 2021, it was announced that in 2022 Brookes would take over as Roxie Hart in the UK tour of the musical Chicago.

Personal life
In 2012, while appearing in a production of Legally Blonde, Brookes met Gareth Gates, who was portraying the role of her character's boyfriend. The pair began a relationship, and got engaged, which was later called off when the pair split in 2018. While together, the pair set up a stage school, Fates Academy.

Filmography

Awards and nominations

References

External links
 

1987 births
Actresses from Manchester
English soap opera actresses
English television actresses
Living people
People from Stretford